The Santos Formation is a geological formation of the Santos Basin offshore of the Brazilian states of Rio de Janeiro, São Paulo, Paraná and Santa Catarina.

Etymology 
The formation is as the Santos Basin named after the city of Santos, São Paulo.

Description 
These facies are interbedded and change laterally into the Itajai-Açu and Juréia Formations. The depositional environment is thought to be transitional continental to marginal marine, ranging from alluvial to braided rivers and deltas. Biostratigraphic data indicate a Late Cretaceous age (Cenomanian-Maastrichtian).

See also 

 Campos Basin

References

Bibliography 
 
 

Geologic formations of Brazil
Santos Basin
Cretaceous Brazil
Upper Cretaceous Series of South America
Maastrichtian Stage of South America
Campanian Stage
Santonian Stage
Coniacian Stage
Turonian Stage
Cenomanian Stage
Conglomerate formations
Sandstone formations
Shale formations
Alluvial deposits
Fluvial deposits
Deltaic deposits
Formations
Formations
Formations
Formations